The 2008 LG Hockey Games were played between February 7 and February 10, 2008 in Stockholm, Sweden.

Sweden lost the final game, 1-2, against Finland despite Swedish goalkeeper Stefan Liv saving many shots.

Final standings

Matches

Best players 

The tournament directorate nominated the following players

 Best goaltender:  Semyon Varlamov
 Best defenceman:  Kenny Jönsson
 Best forward:  Maxim Sushinski

The media All Star Team was named as follows

  Semyon Varlamov, Goaltender
  Ilya Nikulin, Defenceman
  Kenny Jönsson, Defenceman
  Maxim Sushinski, Forward
  Tony Mårtensson, Forward
  Mattias Weinhandl, Forward

References

External links
Hockeyarchives 
Official Games Reports
2008 LG Hockey Games awards

2007–08 Euro Hockey Tour
2007–08 in Swedish ice hockey
2007–08 in Russian ice hockey
2007–08 in Finnish ice hockey
2007–08 in Czech ice hockey
Sweden Hockey Games
February 2008 sports events in Europe
2000s in Stockholm